Almir Ćubara (born 21 November 1997) is a Bosnian professional footballer who plays as a centre-back for GFK Tikvesh in the Macedonian First Football League.

Honours
Željezničar
Bosnian Cup: 2017–18

References

External links
Almir Ćubara at FootballDatabase.eu

1997 births
Living people
Footballers from Sarajevo
Association football central defenders
Bosnia and Herzegovina footballers
FK Olimpik players
NK Bosna Visoko players
FK Željezničar Sarajevo players
NK Čelik Zenica players
NK TOŠK Tešanj players
FK Igman Konjic players
Premier League of Bosnia and Herzegovina players
First League of the Federation of Bosnia and Herzegovina players